Josh Shipp may refer to:
Josh Shipp (basketball) (born 1986), American basketball player
Josh Shipp (media personality) (born 1982), American motivation speaker and television personality